Weet-Bix is a whole-grain wheat breakfast cereal created and manufactured in Australia and New Zealand by the Sanitarium Health Food Company, and in South Africa by Bokomo.

History 

Weet-Bix was developed by Bennison Osborne  in Sydney, Australia in the mid-1920s. Osborne set out to make a product more palatable than Granose, a biscuit that was marketed by the Sanitarium Health Food Company at that time. On 19 August 1926, he lodged an application for registration of the trademark Weet-Bix, a name which he had devised.
Production began at 659 Parramatta Road, Leichhardt, under the management of Osborne and with the financial backing of Arthur Shannon, who created the company "Grain Products" to manufacture the cereal.  Osborne's friend Malcolm Ian Macfarlane from New Zealand joined him to take on a marketing role. The product was so successful that in October 1928, Shannon sold the rights in the product to the Australasian Conference Association Limited (Sanitarium Health Food Company, a wholly owned subsidiary and venture of the Seventh-day Adventist Church in Australia). Macfarlane suggested that they ship the product to New Zealand, where it proved so successful that it became difficult to adequately supply the market from Australia. Osborne and MacFarlane went to New Zealand and factories were established in Auckland and Christchurch. However, once again, Shannon sold out to the Australasian Conference Association Limited.

Osborne and Macfarlane then exported the product to South Africa and with Shannon's financial backing, went to that country and a factory was built in Cape Town, with Osborne managing sales. This enterprise was also subsequently sold, this time to Bokomo.While in South Africa, Osborne and Macfarlane sought to obtain more satisfactory financial backing to secure Osborne's product.  A group was formed, Osborne refined the product and he and Macfarlane went to England to form the British & African Cereal Company, Ltd., which they registered in London in 1932, as a Private Company, with the proprietor shown as Weetabix Limited of Weetabix Mills, Burton Latimer, Kettering.  All shares in the company were specified to be under the control of the Directors, the first of whom were Bennison Osborne, Malcolm Ian Macfarlane, Alfred Richard Upton and Arthur Stanley Scrutton. For the purpose of differentiating the product from that sold in Australia, New Zealand and South Africa, the product was named "Weetabix". 
Osborne and Macfarlane became the joint managing directors with Osborne controlling production and Macfarlane controlling marketing. Sites for the factory were examined, with Burton Latimer in Northamptonshire eventually being chosen, due in part to the offer of a disused flour mill by a Mr. George, who requested shares in the company and who was subsequently offered a seat on the existing board of directors. In 1933, Macfarlane left the company to pursue other business interests, leaving Osborne as the sole managing director. George eventually became chairman of the board. Osborne sold his shareholding to the directors in July 1936, at which time the company was renamed "Weetabix Limited".

Osborne proceeded at that time to the United States, establishing a Weetabix factory in Clinton, Massachusetts. However, the venture was unsuccessful. Weetabix eventually entered the US market from Canada via Clinton, Massachusetts, the site of the original US factory.

Gluten Free Weet-Bix
In July 2014 Sanitarium introduced Gluten Free Weet-Bix, produced from sorghum grains. Earlier in 2014, the company had recommissioned their Perth-based Weet-Bix factory into a dedicated gluten free manufacturing facility to produce this new product.

Brand popularity

Weet-Bix is seen in Australia, New Zealand and South Africa as an iconic national foodstuff. An online poll of 16,000 people in 2006 identified it as Australia's favourite trademark. The product has been marketed in Australia since 1985 with the catchphrase "Aussie Kids are Weet-Bix kids". Based on its success in Australia, a similar catchphrase was adopted six months later in New Zealand: "Kiwi Kids are Weet-Bix kids".

Weet-Bix cards
Sanitarium started to issue collectors' cards in 1942 as a marketing device in their boxes of Weet-Bix and some of their other breakfast cereal products including Granose, Bixies, Cerix and later Puffed Wheat, Puffed Rice, Weeta Puffs, Weeta Flakes and Corn Flakes. Sanitarium have also issued cards in their New Zealand products, sometimes similar to the Australian series but also series with a New Zealand focus such as the All Blacks themed 'Stat Attack' cards.

See also

 Weet-Bix cards – a list of Weet-Bix collector cards
 Weetabix – the UK variant that is now exported to around 80 countries.
 Shredded Wheat – another wheat-based biscuit cereal.
 Granola

References

External links
Weet-Bix Australia

Australian cuisine
New Zealand cuisine
South African cuisine
Sanitarium Health and Wellbeing Company brands